The Nelson H-63, known in the US military designation system as the YO-65, is an American dual ignition, four-cylinder, horizontally opposed, two-stroke aircraft engine that was developed by the Nelson Engine Company for use in helicopters and light aircraft. The engine designation means horizontally opposed 63 cubic inch displacement.

Design and development
The H-63 was designed in the late 1950s specifically to power the sort of very light single-man helicopters that the US Army was investigating at the time. Application for certification was made on 15 March 1958 and the engine was certified under the CAR 13 standard on 8 February 1960.

Engines were produced for Nelson by the Franklin Engine Company of Syracuse, New York under a production certificate. Originally the type certificate was held by the Nelson Specialty Corporation of San Leandro, California, but it was transferred to Nelson Aircraft of Irwin, Pennsylvania on 15 July 1966. Ownership of the type certificate was transferred to the present owner, Charles R. Rhoades of Naples, Florida, on 14 February 1996.

The four-cylinder engine runs on a 16:1 mixture of 80/87 avgas and SAE 30 outboard motor oil. It is equipped with a single Nelson E-500 carburetor.

Variants
H-63A 42 hp @ 4000 rpm
H-63C
Vertically mounted version for use in helicopters, producing  at 4000 rpm.
H-63CP
Horizontally mounted version for use in light aircraft, producing  at 4400 rpm for take-off.
YO-65-2 Military designation for H-63 fitted to the Hiller XROE-1 Rotorcycle

Applications
H-63C
Hiller YROE
H-63CP
Lobet/Shafor Ganagobie

Engines on display
EAA AirVenture Museum

Specifications (H-63C)

See also

References

Air-cooled aircraft piston engines
Nelson aircraft engines
Two-stroke aircraft piston engines